Old Friends is a 1992 jazz live album by pianist André Previn.

Track listing
 "But Not For Me" (George Gershwin, Ira Gershwin) - 7:40
 "Stars Fell on Alabama" (Frank Perkins, Mitchell Parish) - 5:46
 "Stompin' at the Savoy" (Benny Goodman, Edgar Sampson) - 6:30
 "Medley: Darn That Dream / Here's That Rainy Day / Polka Dots and Moonbeams" (Jimmy Van Heusen, Eddie DeLange / Jimmy Van Heusen, Sammy Cahn / Jimmy Van Heusen, Johnny Burke) - 9:09	
 "One O'Clock Jump" (Count Basie) - 6:24
 "Topsy" (Eddie Duran, Edgar Battle) - 4:56
 "Medley: The Bad and the Beautiful, Laura" (David Raksin) - 5:40
 "Moonsweeper Blues" (André Previn) - 8:37
 "Over The Rainbow" (E.Y. "Yip" Harburg, Harold Arlen) - 5:13
 "Satin Doll" (Billy Strayhorn, Duke Ellington, Johnny Mercer) - 6:22
 "Sweet Georgia Brown" (Ben Bernie, Kenneth Casey, Maceo Pinkard) - 4:05

Personnel
 André Previn - piano
 Mundell Lowe - guitar
 Ray Brown - double bass

References

André Previn albums
1992 live albums
Telarc Records live albums